Che Smith (born July 6, 1977), better known by his stage name Rhymefest, is an American rapper from Chicago whose first official album, Blue Collar, was released in 2006. His prominent songwriting credits include co-writing Kanye West's "Jesus Walks", which won Best Rap Song at the 47th Annual Grammy Awards, and "New Slaves", taken from West's sixth studio album Yeezus (2013).

Career 
Born Che Smith in Chicago, Illinois, Rhymefest started off battle rapping at events such as JumpOff and ScribbleJam against acts like Eminem and Chalk. Smith co-wrote "Glory" alongside John Legend and Common, for the 2014 motion picture Selma. The song received the 2014 Golden Globe Award for Best Original Song and the 2014 Academy Award for Best Original Song. Che has expanded his gifts beyond the borders of music. The subject of the Showtime and Break Thru Films documentary,  "In My Father's House", Rhymefest purchased the  childhood home of his estranged father only to find that he'd been homeless for most of Che's life, Rhymefest then embarks on a journey to reconnect and redeem their relationship. Rhymefest's film debut was in Emilio Estevez's 2018 film The Public. He played "Big George", starring alongside Alec Baldwin, Gabrielle Union, Taylor Shilling, Michael K. Williams, Christian Slater, and more. Rhymefest has revealed that he will be releasing an album soon titled Love Lessons Pt. 1. The track "OG Philosophy" featuring Black Thought and Raheem DeVaughn arrived in early 2020.

Politics 
In 2006, Smith was invited to the British House of Commons to discuss hip hop and policy with David Cameron. In October 2010, Smith announced his candidacy for Chicago's 20th ward alderman. He placed second in the February 22, 2011 election, and was defeated by incumbent Willie Cochran in the April 5, 2011 runoff election, getting 45.4% of the vote to Cochran's 54.6%.

In 2016, he hosted a  "Truth & Reconciliation" event series to enhance awareness about gun violence in Chicago.

Art of Culture (formerly Donda's House) 
Rhymefest is Executive Director and co-Founder of Donda's House, Inc., now renamed Art of Culture, Inc. The organization was originally named after Kanye West's mother Donda West. Artists who were accepted into Donda's House include Hex Hectic.

Personal life 
Rhymefest is Muslim. He has three children and is married to Heather Michele Smith.

Che Guevara namesake 
Che Smith, named for the Marxist revolutionary Che Guevara, addressed the matter, stating:

Awards and nominations

Grammy Awards 

|-
|rowspan="2"|2005
|rowspan="2"|Jesus Walks (as songwriter)
| Song of the Year
|
|-
|| Best Rap Song
| 
|-
||2014
|"New Slaves" (as songwriter)
|| Best Rap Song
|
|-
|rowspan="2"|2016
|rowspan="2"|Glory (as songwriter)
|| Best Rap Song
|
|-
|Best Song Written for Visual Media
|

Discography

Albums 
 2006: Blue Collar
 2010: El Che

Singles 
 1996: "This Is How We Chill (Pts. 1 & 2)"
 2005: "Dirty Dirty" (Featuring Ol' Dirty Bastard)
 2006: "Brand New" (featuring Kanye West) #38 Ireland, #32 UK
 2006: "Dynomite (Going Postal)"
 2006: "Fever"
 2006: "Wanted"
 2007: "Angry Black Man on the Elevator" (featuring Lil Jon)
 2009: "Chicago"

Mixtapes 
 2004: Brand New
 2005: A Star Is Born, Vol. 1
 2006: Plugg City: City on My Back
 2008: Mark Ronson Presents: Man in the Mirror
 2009: El Che: The Manual Mixtape
 2010: Dangerous: 5-18
 2010: Man in the Mirror 2.0

References

External links 
 Rhymefest's official site
 
 Rhymefest's Revolution by Craig Lindsey
 Rhymefest: Hip-Hop Is Scared of Revolution? – interview by Ismael AbduSalaam
 Interview on The World Music Foundation Podcast

1977 births
African-American male rappers
African-American Muslims
Allido Records artists
Columbia College Chicago alumni
Grammy Award winners for rap music
Living people
Rappers from Chicago
21st-century American rappers
21st-century American male musicians
21st-century African-American musicians
20th-century African-American people